The following is a list of Australian Field Hockey Clubs

Adelaide

Premier League 
 Forestville Hockey Club
 Grange Royals Hockey Club
 Woodville Hockey Club
 Port Adelaide District Hockey Club
 Adelaide Hockey Club
 Seacliff Hockey Club
 North East Hockey Club
 Adelaide University Hockey Club
 Burnside Hockey Club

Metro 
 Adelaide Hills Hockey Club
 Annesley Old Scholars Hockey Club
 Blackwood Hockey Club
 Bumside Hockey Club
 Enfield Hockey Club
 Flinders University Hockey Club
 PGC/Seymour OCA Hockey Club
 Prince Alfred Collegians Hockey Club
 Pulteney Old Scholars Hockey Club
 St Peter's Old Collegians' Hockey Club
 University of South Australia Hockey Club
 Unley High Old Scholars Hockey Club
 Westminster Hockey Club

Country leagues 

 Barossa Valley Hockey Association
 AM United 
 Gawler Strikers
 Nuriootpa 
 Tanunda
 Trinity College
 Trinity
 Clare & District Hockey Association
Donnybrook
Springstown
Balaklava
Burra
Wendoree
Riverton
Sevenhill
 Lower South East Hockey Association
Redbacks
West
Riddoch Strikers
Tigers
Cavaliers
 Murray Bridge Country Hockey Association
 Naracoorte Hockey Association
Kingston/Luicndale Rangers
Dartmoor
Redlegs
Greenbottles
West Wimmera Broglas
 Port Augusta Hockey Association
 Port Lincoln Hockey Association
Flinders
Marauders
Panthers
Wanderers
 Port Pirie Hockey Association
Park Royal Panthers
Risdon
Saint Andrews
Saint Marks
Strykers
Wolves
Clare
Crystal Brook
 Riverland Hockey Association
 Renmark
 Berri
 Loxton
 Waikerie
 Tatiara Hockey Association
 The Whyalla Hockey Association
 The Yorke Peninsula Hockey Association
 Kadina
 Moonta
 Ardrossan
 Maitland
 Minlaton

See also
 List of field hockey clubs
 List of sporting clubs in Adelaide

External links
Hockey SA website

Hockey
 
Clubs
Field hockey-related lists
Field hockey
Lists of sports clubs in Australia
Sporting clubs in South Australia